Brooksia rostrata is a species of Salpida in the family Salpidae.

References 

Animals described in 1893
Thaliacea